Miss Universe Iceland 2020 was the fifth edition of the Miss Universe Iceland competition. The pageant held on 23 October 2020 at the Stapi Center in Reykjanesbær. Originally scheduled for 21 August, the pageant was rescheduled due to the COVID-19 pandemic.

Birta Abiba Þórhallsdóttir crowned Elísabet Hulda Snorradóttir as her successor. Elísabet will represent Iceland at Miss Universe 2020, while Disa Dungal will represent Iceland at Miss Supranational 2021.

Results

Delegates
The following delegates were selected for the competition:

The following delegates were initially selected as competitors, but withdrew from the competition:

Judges
Aníta Ísey Jónsdóttir – dancer and choreographer
Hildur María Leifsdóttir – Miss Universe Iceland 2016
Hrafnhildur Hafsteinsdóttir – Miss Iceland 1995

References

External links

2020 in Iceland
2020 beauty pageants
Beauty pageants in Iceland
Miss Universe Iceland